Virgil Walter Ross (August 8, 1907 – May 15, 1996) was an American artist, cartoonist, and animator best known for his work on the Warner Bros. animated shorts including the shorts of legendary animator Friz Freleng.

Biography

Early years
Virgil Ross (as he was usually known) spent his early years in New York state and in Michigan, but his family moved to Long Beach, California, when he was in his late teens. This state was to be his primary home for the rest of his life.

Cartooning and animation 
His introduction to cartooning was in high-school, where he took a class in that art form. He started drawing title cards for silent films before moving into animated films. Early work was done for Charles B. Mintz (later Screen Gems), Ub Iwerks studio, and then on to Walter Lantz, where he began working on developing Oswald the Rabbit and met Tex Avery. When Avery moved to work for Leon Schlesinger in 1935 on the Looney Tunes and Merrie Melodies series, he took Ross, Sid Sutherland, and Cecil Surry with him. Ross spent about 30 years there, first under Avery's supervision, and then Bob Clampett after Avery's departure in 1941. Ross moved to Friz Freleng's unit after a year of animating for Clampett, presumably due to Ross' complicated relationship with him. Ross would spend his career with Friz for the rest of him time at Warner Bros., with him animating some of Freleng's most renowned shorts. In 1944, Schlesinger sold the company and it became Warner Bros. Cartoons.

Of the very many characters Ross animated, he is most closely associated with Bugs Bunny. As the animator for A Wild Hare (1940), generally regarded as the first appearance of Bugs Bunny, Ross had a first person view of the creation of the character. It received an Academy Award nomination for Best Cartoon Short Subject.

In the interview of Ross, published in Animato magazine #19, Ross recalled how the character of Bugs Bunny came to be. He says in the interview, "We received orders from the story department that they needed a drawing of a bunny. We all did drawings and tacked them on the wall, and the storymen voted on them. We had one writer named Bugs Hardaway, and for some reason, this one drawing became known as Bugs' Bunny. Leon Schlesinger liked the sound of the name and told them to keep it, and that's how Bugs Bunny got his name. Years later, before he died, Hardaway tried to get some credit for making the character, which he probably deserved. But Warner Bros owned the rights to everything we created."

He also did a great deal of work involving Daffy Duck, Yosemite Sam, Tweety, and many others, including the Rudy Larriva-directed Road Runner and Wile E. Coyote shorts. When handling long-eared characters such as Bugs or Wile E., Ross occasionally tilted or waved an ear in otherwise-static scenes.

His résumé also includes time spent with such firms as Filmation (where he worked on the early 1970s Star Trek: The Animated Series), Hanna Barbera, and Marvel Comics. In 1979 he animated Woody Woodpecker for a special scene at the 51st Academy Awards. He briefly animated for Disney (Via Rick Reinert) for Winnie the Pooh and a Day for Eeyore, for Chuck Jones at Warner Bros. again, and for 1984 educational short "Destination Careers: Explore Jobs". According to animator Dave Bennett, Ross struggled to animate Donald after animating Daffy for so many years.

He was known as being self-effacing. In an interview with John Province in 1989, he is quoted as saying "I always had an eye for movement, and I think this kept me in the business a lot longer than a lot of guys, despite the fact that I really wasn't very good at drawing. When I started out in animation, you didn't have to be a good artist. I just had a little natural talent, and it's mostly just timing anyway."

Personal life and death 
He married Frances Ewing in 1940 and he has a daughter. They were married until Ross' death. Ross died at the age of 88 on May 15, 1996 in Los Angeles, California, United States.

Awards
Virgil Ross received the highest awards available in his profession: the Motion Picture Screen Cartoonists Golden Award (1984) and the Winsor McCay Award (1988). Four of the cartoons he had animated won Oscars: Tweetie Pie (1947),  Speedy Gonzales (1955), Birds Anonymous (1957), and Knighty Knight Bugs (1958).

References

External links
 
Animation Profiles: VIRGIL ROSS

1907 births
1996 deaths
American animators
American cartoonists
People from Watertown, New York
People from Long Beach, California
Warner Bros. Cartoons people
Walter Lantz Productions people
Hanna-Barbera people